Buhach is an unincorporated community in Merced County, California.

The Merced Land and Fruit Company established the Buhach Plantation in the area in 1871. The plantation farmed pyrethrum, which was used to make an insect powder called Buhach. Portuguese immigrants settled the area in the mid-1890s, and the company sold them the land which became known as the Buhach Colony. A social hall opened in Buhach in 1903, and the Buhach Grammar School was established in 1907.

See also 
John Buttencourt Avila, father of the sweet potato industry.

References

Unincorporated communities in California
Unincorporated communities in Merced County, California